Maria Pourchet (born 5 March 1980) is a French novelist. Her novels have been published by Éditions Gallimard in the Collection Blanche. Pourchet was born in Épinal.

Publications

Novels 
 Avancer, novel, Gallimard, Collection Blanche, 2012 
 Rome en un jour, novel, Gallimard, Collection Blanche, 2013  ; "Folio" n° 6057, 2015  Prix Erckmann-Chatrian 2013.
 Champion, novel, Gallimard, Collection Blanche, 2015 
 Toutes les femmes sauf une, September 2018 
 Les Impatients, novel, Gallimard, Collection Blanche

Short stories 
 La 206, in La Nouvelle Revue française (n° 618), Gallimard, May 2016

Other publications (collective works) 
 Les Conditions de la création littéraire under the direction of Maria Pourchet and Audrey Alvès, L’Harmattan, 2011 
 With Sylvie Ducas, Comment le livre vient au lecteur : la prescription littéraire à l’heure de l’hyperchoix et du numérique, in Communication et Langages, Armand Colin, Paris, 2014

References

External links 
 « Littérature d’aujourd’hui » in Répliques, France Culture, with Maria Pourchet and Nicolas Mathieu
 Maria Pourchet on GoodReads

1980 births
Living people
People from Épinal
21st-century French novelists